To levende og en død  is a 1937 Norwegian thriller film directed by Gyda Christensen and Tancred Ibsen and starring Hans Jacob Nilsen, Unni Torkildsen and Jan Vaage. It is based on the 1931 novel To levende og en død by Sigurd Christiansen. A post office worker is left wrestling with his conscience following a robbery at his workplace.

Cast
Hans Jacob Nilsen as Erik Berger, postal clerk 
Unni Torkildsen as Helene Berger 
Jan Vaage as Knut, their son 
Toralf Sandø as Lydersen, postal clerk 
Lauritz Falk as Rognås, bankclerk 
Hans Bille as the postmaster
Hilda Fredriksen as the hostess of the hostel 
Joachim Holst-Jensen as Engelhardt 
Thoralf Klouman as the chief of postal services
Guri Stormoen as shop assistant
Axel Thue as police inspector 
Einar Vaage as Kvisthus 
J. Barclay-Nitter as a postal inspector
Elsa Sandø as Fru Lydersen 
Knut Jacobsen as the doctor 
Kolbjørn Brenda as a postal clerk
Marie Hedemark as guest at the hostel
Ingse Vibe as guest at the hostel
Signe Ramberg as guest at the hostel
Alfred Solaas as guest at the hostel

Bibliography
Soila, Tytti & Söderbergh-Widding, Astrid & Iverson, Gunnar. Nordic National Cinemas. Routledge, 1998.

External links

1937 films
Norwegian thriller films
1930s Norwegian-language films
Films directed by Gyda Christensen
Films directed by Tancred Ibsen
Films based on Norwegian novels
1930s thriller films
Norwegian black-and-white films